William Washington Gordon (January 17, 1796 – March 22, 1842) was an American politician and businessman.

Gordon was born in Screven County, Georgia.  He was named after American Revolutionary War General William Washington under whom Gordon's father, Ambrose Gordon, served as a cavalry lieutenant.

Background
Upon the death of Ambrose Gordon in 1804, William Washington Gordon was sent to school in Rhode Island and then attended the United States Military Academy. He graduated from that institution in 1815 and was the first person from Georgia to do so. He remained in the army for half a year, serving as an aide-de-camp to Edmund P. Gaines. He then returned to Savannah, Georgia to study law under James Moore Wayne.

Gordon would also marry Wayne's niece, Sarah Anderson "Addy" Stites, in 1826 and purchase Wayne's unfinished Savannah home in 1830. Washington's granddaughter, Juliette Gordon Low – founder of the Girl Scouts of the United States of America, was born and raised in the Wayne-Gordon House. The national Girl Scouts organization bought the house in 1953, renovated it and dedicated it on October 19, 1956 as the Juliette Gordon Low Birthplace, a museum in honor of Low. The house was Savannah's first registered National Historic Landmark.

Gordon became a member of the state bar in 1820 and served in several local public positions. In 1834, Gordon was elected as the mayor of Savannah and served in that position until 1836. During his mayoral service, he was elected to the Georgia General Assembly as a member of the House of Representatives in 1835. In 1838, he was elected to the Georgia Senate.

He founded and served as the first president of the Central Railroad and Banking Company of Georgia, which would later be reorganized as the Central of Georgia Railway.  Today the Central of Georgia lines are a component of the Norfolk Southern Railway.

Gordon died in Savannah in 1842 from bilious pleurisy and was originally buried in Colonial Cemetery in that city; however, his grave was later moved to Laurel Grove Cemetery. One year later, in 1843 the railroad he founded desecrated the important Native American site of Ocmulgee National Monument, sacred to the Creek Indians, when it constructed a rail line through the site that partially destroyed the Lesser Temple Mound.  In 1873, the Central Railroad built a second rail line through the site, this time nearly destroying the Funeral Mound which contained the graves of the ancestors of the Creek Indians. The workers removed bones and other artifacts from this burial mound further desecrating this sacred site.

On June 25, 1882, the Central of Georgia Railroad and Banking Company constructed the William Washington Gordon Monument in Savannah's Wright Square. To do so they destroyed the grave of Indian Chief Tomochichi who had given General Oglethorpe the land on which to found the city of Savannah. Gordon's daughter-in-law, Nellie Kinzie Gordon, was outraged at this perceived insult to Tomochichi thus she and other members of the Colonial Dames of the State of Georgia erected a new monument to Tomochichi, made of granite from Stone Mountain, and located in the southwest corner of the square. Gordon, Georgia and Gordon County, Georgia are both named after Gordon.

External links
The New Georgia Encyclopedia entry for William Washington Gordon
Georgia Place-Names, Kenneth K. Krakow 3rd Edition, pp.95–96
Biographical Note from Inventory of the Gordon Family Papers, 1810–1968, Collection Number 2235
Gordon Monument in Wright Square
August 11, 1904 Cornerstone Laying Ceremony: Part IV of V Parade & Special Speakers, City of Savannah Research Library
Juliette Gordon Low birthplace facts

References

1796 births
1842 deaths
19th-century American railroad executives
Georgia (U.S. state) lawyers
Georgia (U.S. state) state senators
Mayors of Savannah, Georgia
Members of the Georgia House of Representatives
Military personnel from Georgia (U.S. state)
United States Military Academy alumni
19th-century American politicians
19th-century American lawyers